Susan Meredith Finch ( Landau; born August 13, 1960) is an American film producer, writer, and director. She has an independent film company called Wildwell Films, based in Los Angeles. She has been married to Roy Finch since November 28, 1999.  They have one daughter born in 2009.

Early life
Landau is the daughter of actors  Barbara Bain and Martin Landau. Both her parents were Jewish. Her younger sister is American actress, director, producer and ballerina Juliet Landau. The sisters spent their early childhood in West Los Angeles.

References

Source

 Jacqueline Plaza. "A Conversation with the Filmmakers of the Award Winning Film, 'Wake'", inmag.com. Accessed September 1, 2022.

External links
 

Living people
American people of Russian-Jewish descent
Place of birth missing (living people)
American film directors
American film producers
1960 births
American people of Austrian-Jewish descent